Fieber is a German surname. Notable people with the surname include:

 Clarence Fieber (1913–1985), American Baseball pitcher
 Franz Xaver Fieber (1807–1872), German botanist and entomologist
 Peter Fieber (born 1964), Slovak football player
 Peter Fieber (footballer born 1989) (born 1989), Slovak football player

See also
 Fever (2014 film), a 2014 Austrian film
 Fieber (Christina Stürmer song), released in 2008
 Fieber (Oomph! song), released in 1999

German-language surnames